Boundary 2, often stylized boundary 2, is a quarterly peer-reviewed academic journal of postmodern theory, literature, and culture. Established in 1972 by William V. Spanos and Robert Kroetsch (Binghamton University), under the title boundary 2, a journal of postmodern literature, the journal moved to Duke University Press in the late 1980s and is now edited by Paul A. Bové (University of Pittsburgh).

Since the early 2000s the journal has been closed to unsolicited submissions. This policy was described by Jeffrey Williams, editor of Minnesota Review, as one that "seems a little too closed, and would go in the opposite direction of taking chances". boundary 2 has published special issues focusing on postmodernism in individual countries such as Greece or Canada, as well as a book of articles previously published in the journal. In an interview published in the Minnesota Review, Spanos discusses the history of the journal, its financial and editorial problems, and the motivations for various changes over the years, including the journal's practice of publishing articles by invitation only, refusing unsolicited submissions.

The Boundary 2 editorial collective also publishes an online-only, open access peer-reviewed journal called b2o: an online journal, which appears two or three times each year.

Abstracting and indexing
The journal is abstracted and indexed in:

References

Further reading

External links 

Cultural journals
Triannual journals
English-language journals
Duke University Press academic journals
Publications established in 1972